Armed America: Portraits of Gun Owners in Their Homes, published in 2006 by Krause Publications, is a book by American photographer Kyle Cassidy. The book examines who is a gun owner, and their reasons for owning a gun.

References

External links
Author's website
armedamerica.org

German review

2007 non-fiction books
Books of photographs